The National is the debut studio album by American indie rock band the National, released on October 30, 2001 on Brassland Records. Recorded prior to guitarist Bryce Dessner's full arrival into the band, The National was produced by both Nick Lloyd and the band itself. Now-bass guitarist Scott Devendorf performs both guitar and backing vocals on this album, with guitarist and multi-instrumentalist Aaron Dessner on bass guitar and guitar duties.

The album features a more country-tinged sound in comparison to future albums. Lyrics from "29 Years" would later be used in "Slow Show" from the band's 2007 album, Boxer.

Background and recording
The album features guest contributions from forthcoming member Bryce Dessner, with his brother Aaron noting, "When we recorded [the album], my brother wasn't even in the band. We made the record before we ever played a show. We did it just to do it."

Artwork
The album's front cover features drummer Bryan Devendorf in a swimming pool.

Track listing

Personnel

The National
Matt Berninger - lead vocals
Scott Devendorf - bass guitar, backing vocals
Aaron Dessner - guitar
Bryan Devendorf - drums
Bryce Dessner - guitar

Additional musicians
Mike Brewer
Nathalie Jonas
Nick Lloyd
Jeff Salem

Recording personnel
Nick Lloyd - producer, recording, mixing
Mike Brewer - pre-production
Jeff Salem - pre-production
Ue Nastasi - mastering

Artwork
Mauricio Carey - photography
Pope Rathman - photography

Charts

References

2001 debut albums
The National (band) albums
Brassland Records albums